Madonna and Child with St Rose and St Catherine is a c.1490–1492 tondo oil on panel painting by Pietro Perugino and Andrea Aloigi. It shows the Madonna and Child with Rose of Viterbo and Catherine of Alexandria surrounded by angels  It was sold from the collection of William II of the Netherlands in 1850 to the Louvre, where it now hangs.

References

Paintings in the Louvre by Italian artists
Paintings of the Madonna and Child by Pietro Perugino
1492 paintings
Perugino
Angels in art